The Bishop of Clonfert and Kilmacduagh was the Ordinary of the Church of Ireland diocese of Clonfert and Kilmacduagh, comprising the southern part of County Galway and a small area of County Roscommon, Ireland. In 1834, Clonfert and Kilmacduagh became part of the united bishopric of Killaloe and Clonfert.

History
Roland Lynch, Bishop of Kilmacduagh, held the see of Clonfert "in commendam" from 1602 until his death in 1625; thereafter the sees of Clonfert and Kilmacduagh were united. Under the Church Temporalities (Ireland) Act 1833, the see of Clonfert and Kilmacduagh was united with Killaloe and Kilfenora to form the united bishopric of Killaloe and Clonfert in 1834.

List of bishops

See also

 Clonfert Cathedral
 Kilmacduagh monastery

References

Clonfert and Kilmacduagh
Religion in County Galway
Clonfert and Kilmacduagh